Ninzo may be,

Ninzo language, Nigeria
Ninzo Matsumura, Japanese botanist